Desaspidin is an anthelmintic. Desapidin may occur in natural form within some plants such as Coastal woodfern, Dryopteris arguta. Since the 1950s the inhibition effects of desapidins upon phosphorylation in chloroplasts has been noted and studied.

References

Anthelmintics
Cyclohexadienes
Piceol ethers
Resorcinols
Propyl compounds